The Dandenong Burrowing Crayfish (Engaeus urostrictus)  is an Australian freshwater crustacean in the Parastacidae family. As its common name suggests, the Dandenong Burrowing Crayfish is found in the Dandenong Ranges east of Melbourne, Australia.

Engaeus urostrictus is listed as vulnerable on the IUCN Red List of Threatened Species.

Habitat 
The Dandenong Burrowing Crayfish occurs in riparian zones characterised by sandy soil flats adjacent to small, slow-flowing headwater streams with high organic content. The Crayfish builds extensive burrow systems with many lateral branches amongst buried, rotting plants and roots of ferns, shrubs and trees. The riparian burrow systems of the species have tunnels which descend to the water table, allowing the crayfish to follow the rise and fall of the water table. The species can form chimneys of excavated soil pellets up to 13 cm high.

References

Sources
Doran, N. & Horwitz, P. 2010. Engaeus urostrictus. IUCN Red List of Threatened Species 2010. Retrieved 5 February 2017.

Parastacidae
Freshwater crustaceans of Australia
Vulnerable fauna of Australia
Crustaceans described in 1969
Taxonomy articles created by Polbot